The Battle of Lucena, also called Battle of Martín González, was a war event in which Christian forces of the Crown of Castile were faced against the Muslim forces of the Nasrid Emirate of Granada. It took place in the month of April of the year 1483, in the course of the Granada War, and in the course of it the Christian forces took Muhammad XII of Granada as prisoner.

Description 

It was fought very close to the city of Lucena, in the province of Córdoba, Andalusia, Spain, south of the Sierra de Aras. The origin of the battle was the pretense of Muhammad XII of Granada (Boabdil) to take Lucena and perform a punishment raid against the Christians, to emulate the victory that his competitor, Muhammad XIII had won, that defeated the Christian forces at the Al-Sarquiyya (Córdoba). The Emirate of Granada was at that time experiencing a serious internal conflict between the supporters of the sultan Abu l-Hasan Ali and those who supported his son Muhammad XII of Granada (Boabdil).

Muhammad XII (Boabdil) besieged Lucena on April 20, 1483, with the help of his father-in-law Ibrahim Aliatar, mayor of Loja, an expert of the lands of southern Córdoba and a great winner of the Nasrids in terms of raids against Christians. The city of Lucena was defended by the "alcaide de los Donceles" Diego Fernández de Córdoba y Arellano and the alcaide of Lucena Hernando de Argote. The alcaide de los Donceles lit the merlons of the watchtowers to ask help to his uncle Diego Fernández de Córdoba y Carrillo de Albornoz, 2nd count of Cabra, who came with his army from the nearby Cabra. Muhammad XII (Boabdil) arranged his army in the northwest direction to avoid being caught by surprise by the count's army; However, seeing that they were outnumbered, they withdrew to the outskirts of the city, where the battle began as such.

Capture of Muhammad XII (Boabdil) 
In the course of the battle, the Muslim forces fled in disarray. Ibrahim Aliatar, Muhammad XII's father-in-law, died in battle and Muhammad XII tried to escape, but his horse got stuck in the mud and he had to hide in the vegetation. An infantry squad had him detained and the soldiers deduced that he was some important man because of his clothing, which it made possible for the Christians to capture Muhammad XII (Boabdil), who was taken prisoner to the Castle of Moral (in Lucena). After such success, the nephew (the alcaide de los Donceles) and the uncle (the count of Cabra) began a dispute to see who would deliver the prisoner to the Catholic Monarchs. Such was the dispute that Ferdinand II of Aragon ordered both of them to take the sultan at Porcuna, where he was imprisoned again in the castle's tower, currently known as Torre de Boabdil (Tower of Muhammad XII).

The clothing, shoes and swords of Muhammad XII (Boabdil) were given by the Catholic Monarchs as a gift to the alcaide de los Donceles and the count of Cabra. The whole set is, currently, displayed at the Army Museum of Toledo.

References 

1480s in Spain
1483 in Europe
Lucena
Lucena
Lucena
Lucena
Lucena
History of the province of Córdoba, Spain